Keo Rumchong (born 7 January 1988) is a Cambodian professional Kun Khmer fighter.

Biography and career 
Originating from the Battambang Province of Cambodia, Rumchong first began learning Kun Khmer at the age of five. In Cambodia, he became a multiple-time Bayon TV Kun Khmer champion. 

Regarded as a legend in his home country, Rumchong has fought overseas on multiple occasions. He has appeared on the Thai promotion Thai Fight, where he has competed under their signature Kard Chuek ruleset. While there, he has faced fighters like Yodsanklai Fairtex and Iquezang Kor.Rungthanakeat. 

On October 24, 2015, Keo Rumchong lost in controversial fashion to Iquezang Kor.Rungthanakeat at THAI FIGHT: 1st Round in Ho Chi Minh City, Vietnam. This would be the first of three fights the two would engage in. 

After defeating Maung Jor of Myanmar at THAI FIGHT: 2nd Round on November 21, 2015, Rumchong set himself up for a rematch with Iquezang. In their second fight, the Cambodian was able to secure the decision victory at THAI FIGHT Count Down on December 31, 2015.

Keo Rumchong next faced the Ukrainian Sasha Moisa in the 2018 Thai Fight Kard Chuek 70kg King's Cup Tournament semi-final at THAI FIGHT Saraburi on November 24, 2018. Being the shorter fighter by 14 centimeters, Rumchong was overwhelmed by Moisa's heavy hands and was knocked down three times en route to a second-round technical knockout.   

On November 24, 2019, Rumchong faced Omar Samb for the MTGP Super Welterweight -75kg Championship at Muay Thai Grand Prix 31 Bataclan in Paris. He lost by fourth-round technical knockout.

In 2023, Keo Rumchong was left off the national team in the 81kg weight class in favor of Prom Samnang.  He wanted to represent Cambodia before he retired.

Championships and accomplishments
 2011 Bayon TV Kun Khmer 67kg Champion 
 2014 Bayon TV Kubota Kun Khmer 70kg Champion

Fight record 

|-  style="background:#cfc;"
| 2020-11-29|| Win ||align=left| Vung Noy || Bayon TV Carabao Kun Khmer || Phnom Penh, Cambodia || TKO || 4 ||
|-
|-  style="background:#fbb;"
| 2020-02-21|| Loss ||align=left| Krongchak || Bayon TV Boxing || Phnom Penh, Cambodia || Decision || 5 ||3:00
|-
|-  style="background:#cfc;"
| 2020-02-02|| Win ||align=left| Plerngnom || Bayon TV Carabao Kun Khmer || Phnom Penh, Cambodia || Decision || 5 ||3:00
|-
|-  style="background:#cfc;"
| 2019-12-29|| Win ||align=left| Kazuki Yamagiwa || Bigbang 37: The Road to Unification || Tokyo, Japan || Decision || 3 || 3:00
|-
|-  style="background:#fbb;"
| 2019-11-24|| Loss ||align=left| Omar Samb || Muay Thai Grand Prix 31 || Paris, France || TKO || 4 || 
|-
! style=background:white colspan=9 |
|-  style="background:#cfc;"
| 2019-07-28|| Win ||align=left| Iquezang Kor.Rungthanakeat || Ek Phnom Kun Khmer Arena || Battambang, Cambodia || Decision || 5 || 3:00
|-
|-  style="background:#cfc;"
| 2019-05-10|| Win ||align=left| Jacksiam || Bayon TV Boxing || Phnom Penh, Cambodia || KO || 3 ||  
|-
|-  style="background:#fbb;"
| 2018-11-24|| Loss ||align=left| Sasha Moisa || THAI FIGHT Saraburi || Saraburi, Thailand || TKO || 2 ||  
|-
|-  style="background:#fbb;"
| 2018-10-14|| Loss ||align=left| Dabmorn Pumpanmuang || Bayon TV Carabao Kun Khmer || Phnom Penh, Cambodia || KO || 4 || 
|-
|-  style="background:#cfc;"
| 2018-08-10|| Win ||align=left| Takunsingha || Bayon TV Boxing || Phnom Penh, Cambodia || Decision || 5 || 3:00 
|-
|-  style="background:#cfc;"
| 2018-09-02|| Win ||align=left| Chalermdeth Sor. Tawanrung || Bayon TV Carabao Kun Khmer || Phnom Penh, Cambodia || Decision || 5 || 3:00 
|-
|-  style="background:#cfc;"
| 2018-07-07|| Win ||align=left| Taksila || Bayon TV Boxing || Phnom Penh, Cambodia || TKO || 3 ||  
|-
|-  style="background:#cfc;"
| 2018-04-18|| Win||align=left| Louksue|| Bayon TV Carabao Kun Khmer || Phnom Penh, Cambodia || KO || 2 || 
|-
|-  style="background:#cfc;"
| 2018-02-17|| Win ||align=left| Takoolsing Thor Jatuthen || Bayon TV Boxing || Phnom Penh, Cambodia || KO || 4 ||  
|-
|-  style="background:#cfc;"
| 2018-01-21|| Win ||align=left| Petchpirun NK Muaythai || Bayon TV Boxing || Phnom Penh, Cambodia || KO || 2 ||  
|-
|-  style="background:#cfc;"
| 2017-12-22|| Win ||align=left| Tongta Petchinda || Bayon TV Boxing || Phnom Penh, Cambodia || KO || 3 ||  
|-
|-  style="background:#cfc;"
| 2016-11-27|| Win ||align=left| Takunsingha || Bayon TV Carabao Kun Khmer || Phnom Penh, Cambodia || KO || 3 ||  
|-
|-  style="background:#fbb;"
| 2016-10-29|| Loss ||align=left| Morgan Adrar || Best of Siam 9 || Paris, France || Decision || 5 || 3:00 
|-
|-  style="background:#cfc;"
| 2016-03-12|| Win ||align=left| Bird Kham || Bayon TV Boxing || Phnom Penh, Cambodia || Decision || 5 || 3:00 
|-
|-  style="background:#c5d2ea;" 
| 2016-02-10|| Draw ||align=left| Arbi Emiev || Apsara TV Kun Khmer || Phnom Penh, Cambodia || Decision || 5 || 3:00   
|-
|-  style="background:#cfc;"
| 2015-12-31|| Win ||align=left| Iquezang Kor.Rungthanakeat || THAI FIGHT Count Down || Bangkok, Thailand || Decision || 3 || 3:00 
|-
|-  style="background:#cfc;"
| 2015-11-21|| Win||align=left| Maung Jor || THAI FIGHT 2015: 2nd Round || Nakhon Pathom, Thailand || Decision || 3 || 3:00
|-
|-  style="background:#fbb;"
| 2015-10-24|| Loss||align=left| Iquezang Kor.Rungthanakeat || THAI FIGHT 2015: 1st Round || Ho Chi Minh City, Vietnam || Decision || 3 ||3:00
|-  style="background:#fbb;"
| 2015-06-21|| Loss||align=left| Long Sophy || Bayon TV Carabao Kun Khmer || Phnom Penh, Cambodia || TKO || 4 || 
|-
! style=background:white colspan=9 |
|-  style="background:#cfc;"
| 2014-06-15|| Win||align=left| Prom Samnang || Bayon TV Boxing || Phnom Penh, Cambodia || Decision || 5 || 3:00   
|-
! style=background:white colspan=9 |
|-  style="background:#fbb;"
| 2014-02-22|| Loss||align=left| Yodsanklai Fairtex || THAI FIGHT WORLD BATTLE 2014: Klai Kang Won || Hua Hin, Thailand || KO || 2 ||
|-  style="background:#fbb;"
| 2013-12-06|| Loss||align=left| Vung Noy || Bayon TV Boxing || Phnom Penh, Cambodia || KO || 2 ||
|-  style="background:#cfc;"
| 2013-11-20|| Win||align=left| Ot Phutong || Bayon TV Boxing || Phnom Penh, Cambodia || KO || 4 ||
|-  style="background:#fbb;"
| 2013-11-08|| Loss||align=left| Vung Noy || Bayon TV Boxing || Phnom Penh, Cambodia || Decision || 5 || 3:00
|-  style="background:#cfc;"
| 2013-09-27|| Win||align=left| Wat Chalek || Cambodia Khmer Fighter || Phnom Penh, Cambodia || Decision || 5 ||3:00
|-  style="background:#cfc;"
| 2013-06-28|| Win||align=left| Luca Novello || Cambodia Khmer Fighter || Phnom Penh, Cambodia || Decision || 5 ||3:00
|-  style="background:#cfc;"
| 2013-06-07|| Win||align=left| Chan Rothana || Bayon TV Boxing || Phnom Penh, Cambodia || Decision || 5 ||3:00
|-  style="background:#cfc;"
| 2013-04-26|| Win||align=left| Adaylton Freitas || Cambodia Khmer Fighter || Phnom Penh, Cambodia || Decision || 5 ||3:00
|-  style="background:#c5d2ea;" 
| 2013-03-17|| Draw ||align=left| Chey Kosal || Bayon TV Boxing || Phnom Penh, Cambodia || Decision || 5 || 3:00   
|-
|-  style="background:#cfc;"
| 2012-12-09 || Win ||align=left| Victor Nagbe || Muaythai Warriors in Cambodia || Phnom Penh, Cambodia || Decision (Unanimous) || 3 || 3:00
|- style="background:#cfc;"
| 2012-11-23|| Win ||align=left| Teeraphong || CTN Boxing || Phnom Penh, Cambodia || Decision || 5 || 3:00
|- style="background:#cfc;"
| 2012-03-03|| Win ||align=left| Dino Adad || Gala international France vs. Cambodge || Paris, France || TKO  || 2 ||
|- style="background:#cfc;"
| 2012-01-15|| Win ||align=left| Anvar Boynazarov || Khmer Fight || Phnom Penh, Cambodia || TKO (Injury) || 1 ||
|- style="background:#cfc;"
| 2011-11-24|| Win ||align=left| Long Sovandoeun || Bayon TV Boxing || Phnom Penh, Cambodia || Decision || 5 || 3:00 
|-
! style=background:white colspan=9 |
|-  style="background:#fbb;"
| 2011-11-04|| Loss ||align=left| Long Sovandoeun || Bayon TV Boxing || Phnom Penh, Cambodia || Decision || 5 || 3:00 
|-
! style=background:white colspan=9 |
|-  style="background:#fbb;"
| 2011-10-14|| Loss ||align=left| Long Sovandoeun || Bayon TV Boxing || Phnom Penh, Cambodia || Decision || 5 || 3:00
|-  style="background:#cfc;"
| 2011-08-18|| Win||align=left| Chan Rothana || Bayon TV Boxing || Phnom Penh, Cambodia || Decision || 5 ||3:00
|-  style="background:#c5d2ea;" 
| 2011-01-09|| Draw ||align=left| Long Sophy || Bayon TV Boxing || Phnom Penh, Cambodia || Decision || 5 || 3:00   
|-
|-
| colspan=9 | Legend:

References

Living people
1988 births 
People from Battambang province
Cambodian male kickboxers
Welterweight kickboxers 
Middleweight kickboxers